Warana Power Co-operative legally known as Shree Tatyasaheb Kore Warana Sahakari Navashkti Sanstha Ltd. Warananagar, is a cooperative organization generating electric power from non-conventional, natural clean energy resources, such as hydro and biomass through the co-operative sector.  These members are other co-operative organizations of Warana Group.  They have also proposed to generate electric energy from wind, solar, tidal and geothermal, and later from other conventional energy resources.

Warana Group

The transformation of Warana from a barren to its current prosperous and fertile region began with the setting up of a cooperative sugar factory near the village of Kodoli in 1959. The Warana Power Co-operative idea of generating energy through co-operative organization was grown in the mind of Vinay Kore; and in January 2005, Warana Power Co-operative had been established. To start, Warana Power Co-operative took up 6 small hydro power projects form the state government of Maharashtra under the BOT (build–operate–transfer) policy.

Hydro power projects

The hydro power projects, all located in Kolhapur district, Maharashtra, India, are as follows:

Present Total Proposed power generation is 10.6MW through Hydro Power

Warana co-generation project of 44MW has also started under the Warana Power Co-operative, which is attached with Warana Sugar. Bagasse, a waste product of sugar cane, will be used as fuel in the co-generation plant for the 150-day crushing period of the sugar factory; and for remaining 150 days, imported coal or biomass such as sugarcane trash, cotton stalk, rice husk. Julie Flora is apparently known Babool Tree in Hindi; need to link to actual plant name. --> sawdust, etc. will be used.

References

Renewable resource companies established in 2005
Cooperatives in Maharashtra
Electric cooperatives
Electric-generation companies of India
Hydroelectric power companies
Kolhapur district
Energy in Maharashtra
Indian companies established in 2005
Energy companies established in 2005
2005 establishments in Maharashtra